Spring of a Twenty Year Old is a single album by South Korean singer-songwriter IU. It was released as a CD single. The single has a double A-side hit singles, "Peach" and "Every End of the Day" which was also released digitally, consists of three tracks in total, one of which was composed by IU. It is the singer's first Korean-language release since the full-length album, Last Fantasy, that was released six months prior.. The latter topped the Billboard K-pop Hot 100 for four consecutive weeks, making it IU's second number-one hit on the chart after "You and I". The single has sold over 34,400 copies in South Korea as of 2013.

Release and promotion
The full CD was released on May 11, 2012. It contained the already-released "Peach", "Every End of the Day", and "I Really Don't Like Her". The album was immediately successful; all three songs achieved the top 10 spots on the South Korean music websites Mnet, MelOn, and Olleh Music. "Every End of the Day" managed to achieve the number one spot on these websites.

The same day, the music video for the track, "Every End of the Day", was released. This 26-minute-long short film is done in a documentary style and features interviews with IU as well as footage from her previously mentioned trip to Venice. The song itself is a lively up-tempo song, that sounds similar to older pop music. The arrangement features string instruments. The lyrics and music video tell the tale of a girl who is deeply in love with a man that she hopes will make the first move.

One week after the album's release, the single, "Every End of the Day", managed to make it to the first place spot on the Billboard Korea K-Pop Hot 100 and topped the chart for three weeks in a row.

The final song on the album, "I Really Don't Like Her", is about a girl who resents a lost love for not giving her the attention she wanted. The song features an acoustic guitar and is done in an R&B ballad style.

To prepare for her first solo concert, "Real Fantasy", IU did not perform any broadcast promotions for Spring of a Twenty Year Old.

Track listing
※ Bolded tracks identify promotional tracks from the album.

Charts

Weekly charts

Monthly charts

Year-end charts

Release history

See also
 List of K-pop Hot 100 number ones
 List of Gaon Digital Chart number ones of 2012

References

External links
 

2012 singles
K-pop songs
2012 songs
IU (singer) songs